The Enigma of Life is the fifth studio album by the Norwegian gothic metal band Sirenia and their second with the Spanish vocalist Ailyn. It was released on 21 January 2011 through Nuclear Blast. The album was mastered at Finnvox Studios in Finland. The download-only single, "The End of It All", was released on 21 December 2010.

Track listing
All songs written by Morten Veland.

 "The End of It All" has a video.

Personnel

Sirenia
Morten Veland – vocals, all other instruments
Ailyn – vocals

Session musicians
Stephanie Valentin – violins
Damien Surian, Mathieu Landry, Emmanuelle Zoldan, Sandrine Gouttebel, Emilie Lesbros – The Sirenian Choir

Additional notes
Spanish translations of "El Enigma de la Vida" and "Oscura Realidad" by Ailyn
"The Enigma of Life" was recorded in Audio Avenue Studios (Tau, Norway), additional recordings of choirs, acoustic guitars and violin were recorded in Sound Suite Studios (Marseille, France)
Written, composed, arranged, produced, mixed and engineered by Morten Veland
Pre-produced in Audio Avenue Studios (Tau, Norway)
Mastered by Mika Jussila, Finnvox Studios
A+R by Jaap Waagemaker
Cover artwork & design by Gustavo Sazes
Band photos by Patric Ullaeus

Charts

References

External links
 Metallum Archives
 The Enigma of Life at discogs.com

2011 albums
Nuclear Blast albums
Sirenia (band) albums